Eburiola geminata is a species of beetle in the family Cerambycidae, the only species in the genus Eburiola.

References

Heteropsini